Basílio Mosso Ramos (born January 17, 1952) is a Cape Verdean politician who was the 5th president of the National Assembly of Cape Verde from 2011 to 2016.

He came to politics as a PAICV member.

He went to several European universities including the Catholic University of Louvain (or Leuven) where he studied sociology and later received his alma mater and the University of Lisbon.

He was the Cape Verdean deputy and minister of Health in 2002.  He later became the 5th president of the National Assembly from 11 March 2011 to 20 April 2016.  He succeeded Aristides Lima and was succeeded by Jorge Pedro Mauricio dos Santos.

References

External links
Biography at the National Assembly website (pdf)

1952 births
Living people
People from Sal, Cape Verde
African Party for the Independence of Guinea and Cape Verde politicians
Cape Verdean sociologists
African Party for the Independence of Cape Verde politicians
University of Lisbon alumni
Catholic University of Leuven alumni
Presidents of the National Assembly (Cape Verde)